Teachings from the Electronic Brain is a compilation of songs from throughout the career of British band The Future Sound of London, and was released in 2006.  The diversity of their wide range of work is even more apparent on a compilation such as this.

Album
The album also includes two songs they recorded under the name Amorphous Androgynous.
Despite favourable reviews in the press, the album has been unpopular with fans, who have criticised its track list as being lazy, drawing largely from Dead Cities, and with tracks simply fading in and out rather than being properly mixed.
However, in an interview with "Barcodezine" (who found it favourable) Cobain states:

Track listing

 "Papua New Guinea" (12" version) – 4:59
 "Max" – 2:55
 "Everyone in the World Is Doing Something Without Me" – 2:00
 "My Kingdom" – 5:39
 "Smokin' Japanese Babe" – 5:14
 "Antique Toy" – 4:15
 "Lifeforms" (radio edit) – 4:39
 "Yage" – 6:23
 "Expander" (12" version) – 4:52
 "Glass" – 4:55
 "The Far-Out Son of Lung and the Ramblings of a Madman" – 4:15
 "The Lovers" – 5:57
 "Mountain Goat" – 4:41
 "Cascade" (shortform) – 4:17
 "We Have Explosive" (7" edit) – 3:10

Crew
Artwork by [design] – Andrew Day in The Red Room, EMI
Compiled by – Future Sound Of London, The
Engineer – Stone Freshwaters (tracks: 12), Yage
Mastered by – Ian Jones (4)
Other [directed by] – FSOL (tracks: 13)
Other [project coordinator] – Libby Jones, Paula Flack
Producer – Future Sound Of London, The (tracks: 1 to 12, 14, 15), Philip Pin (tracks: 13)
Written by – Brian Dougans, Elizabeth Fraser (tracks: 7), Garry Cobain
"Max" written by Max Richter

References

External links
 
 

The Future Sound of London compilation albums
2006 compilation albums